The Acacians, also known as the Homoians or Homoeans, were an Arian sect which played a major role in the Christianization of the Goths in the Danubian provinces of the Roman Empire.

They first emerged into distinctness as an ecclesiastical party some time before the convocation of the joint synods of Rimini and Seleucia Isauria in 359. The sect owed its name (oi peri Akakion, those of Acacius) and political importance to Acacius, Bishop of Caesarea, whose theory of adherence to scriptural phraseology it adopted and endeavoured to summarize in its various catch words: homoios, homoios kata panta, k.t.l.

Background
In order to understand the theological significance of Acacianism as a critical episode in both the logical and historical progress of Arianism, it is needful to recall that the definition of the Homoousion, promulgated at the First Council of Nicaea in 325, rather than putting an end to further discussion, became the occasion for keener debate and for still more confusion of statement in the formulation of theories on the relationship of the Son of God to His Father. Events had already begun to ripen towards a fresh crisis shortly after the advent of Emperor Constantius II to sole power, on the death of his brother Constans in the year 350. The new augustus was a man with a turn for theological debate (Ammianus, XXI, xvi) that soon made him a strong promoter of the Eusebian faction. Roughly speaking, there were at this period only three parties in the Church: the Nicene party, who sympathized for the most part with Athanasius and his supporters; the Eusebian or Court party and their Semi-Arian followers; and, last of all, the Anomoean party which owed its origin to Aetius. In the summer of 357, Ursacius of Singidunum and Valens of Mursa, the advocates of this latter group of dissidents in the West, through the influence which they were enabled to bring to bear upon the Emperor by means of his second wife, Eusebia (Panegyr. Jul. Orat., iii; Ammianus, XXI, vi, 4), succeeded in bringing about a conference of bishops at Sirmium.

Sirmian Manifesto
In the Latin creed put forth at this meeting there was inserted a statement of views drawn up by Potamius of Lisbon and Hosius of Cordoba, which, under the name of the Sirmian Manifesto, as it afterwards came to be known, threw the Church into disorder. In this statement the assembled prelates, while declaring their confession in "One God, the Father Almighty, and in His only-begotten Son, our Lord Jesus Christ, generated from Him before the ages," recommended the disuse of the terms ousia (essence, or substance), homoousion (identical in essence, or substance), and homoiousion (similar in essence, or substance), "by which the minds of many are perturbed"; and they held that there "ought to be no mention of any of them at all, nor any exposition of them in the Church, and for this reason and for this consideration that there is nothing written about them in divine Scripture and that they are above men's knowledge and above men's understanding" (Athan., De Syn., xxviii; Soz., ii, xxx; Hil., De Syn., xi). In spite of the scriptural disclaimer against the employment of inscrutable terms, nearly all parties perceived that the Manifesto was a subtly Anomoean document.

The situation was assuredly rich in possibilities. Men began to group themselves along new lines. In the East, the Anomoeans turned almost as a matter of course to Acacius of Caesarea, whose influence was growing stronger at court and who was felt to be a shrewd temporizer. In the West, bishops like Ursacius of Singidunum and Valens of Mursa began to carry on a like policy; and everywhere it was felt that the time called once more for concerted action on the part of the Church. This was precisely what the party in favour with the Emperor Constantius II were eager to bring about; but not in the way in which the Nicaeans and Moderates expected. A single council might not be easily controlled; but two separate synods, one sitting in the East and the other in the West, could be kept better in hand.

After a number of preliminary conferences accompanying an inevitable campaign of pamphleteering in which Hilary of Poitiers took part, the bishops of the Western portion of the Empire met at Ariminum towards the end of May, and those of the East at Seleucia Isauria in the month of September, 359. The theological complexion of both Synods was identical, at least in this, that the party of compromise, represented at Seleucia by Acacius and at Ariminum by Ursacius and Valens, was politically, though not numerically, in the ascendant and could exercise a subtle influence which depended almost as much on the argumentative ability of their leaders as on their curial prestige. In both councils, as the result of dishonest intrigue and an unscrupulous use of intimidation, the Homoian formula associated with the name of Acacius ultimately prevailed.

The Homousion, for which so much had been endured by Athanasians for over half a century, was given up and the Son was declared to be similar to—and not actually exactly equal or identical in essence with—the God the Father.

Theological position 

Homoianism (from gr. hómoios) declared that the Son was similar to God the Father, without reference to essence or substance. Some supporters of Homoian formulae also supported one of the other descriptions.

Other Homoians declared that God the father was so incomparable and ineffably transcendent that even the ideas of likeness, similarity or identity in substance or essence with the subordinate Son and the Holy Spirit were heretical and not justified by the Gospels. They held that the Son was like the Father in some sense but that even to speak of "ousia" was impertinent speculation.

Influences and decline
It was Acacius and his followers who had managed the whole proceeding from the outset. By coming forward as advocates of temporizing methods, they had inspired the Eusebian or Semi-Arian party with the idea of throwing over Atius and his Anomoeans.  As they had proved themselves in practice all through the course of the unlooked-for movement that brought them to the front, so were they now, in theory, the exponents of the Via Media of their day.

The Acacians separated themselves from the Athanasians and Niceans, by the rejection of the word "homoousios"; from the Semi-Arians by their surrender of the "homoiousios"; and from the Aetians by their insistence upon the term homoios.

They retained their influence as a distinct party just so long as their spokesman and leader Acacius enjoyed the favour of Constantius. Under Julian the Apostate, Atius, who had been exiled as the result of the proceedings at Seleucia, was allowed to regain his influence. The Acacians seized the occasion to make common cause with his ideas, but the alliance was only political; they threw him over once more at the Synod of Antioch held under Jovian in 363.

In 365 the Semi-Arian Synod of Lampsacus condemned Acacius. His theological ideas were considered too extreme by the Semi-Arians. He was deposed from his seat, and with that event the history of the party to which he had given his name, in all practicality, ended.

Notes

References
Athanasius, De Synodis
Socrates Scholasticus, Historia Ecclesiastica
Sozomen, Historia Ecclesiastica
Theodoret, Historia Ecclesiastica
John Henry Newman, Arians of the Fourth Century, (1871)

Arianism
Christian terminology
Nature of Jesus Christ